Native Son is the first studio album by American alternative rock band the Judybats, released in 1991 by Sire Records. The title track peaked at No. 9 on the Billboard Modern Rock Tracks chart.

Promotion 
Prior to the album's release, "She Lives (In a Time of Her Own)" had appeared on Where the Pyramid Meets the Eye: A Tribute to Roky Erickson (1990). "Don't Drop the Baby" later appeared on the Sire Records various artists sampler album Just Say Yes Volume V: Just Say Anything (1991).

Music videos were made for the songs "Native Son," "Don't Drop the Baby", "Daylight" and "She Lives (In a Time of Her Own)."

Track listing 
All music by the Judybats, lyrics by Jeff Heiskell, except where otherwise indicated.

"Native Son" – 3:19  	
"Daylight" – 3:19	  	
"Convalescing in Spain" – 4:07	  	
"Don't Drop the Baby" – 3:42 	
"She Lives (In a Time of Her Own)" (Tommy Hall, Roky Erickson) – 4:06
"Incognito" – 3:03
"In Like With You" – 4:06  	
"Woman in the Garden" – 3:58 	
"Waiting for the Rain" – 4:08  	
"Counting Sheep" – 3:25	  	
"Perfumed Lies" (Lyrics: Johnny Sughrue) – 3:44  	
"The Wanted Man" – 4:45

Personnel 
The Judybats
Jeff Heiskell – lead vocals
Ed Winters – electric guitars
Terry Casper – drums
Peggy Hambright – keyboards, violin & vocals
Timothy Stutz – electric bass & vocals
Johnny Sughrue – acoustic guitar & vocals

Technical
Richard Gottehrer – co-producer
Jeffrey Lesser – co-producer, engineer
David Cooke – additional engineering
Jeff Lippay – assistant engineer
Chris Laidlaw – assistant engineer
Greg Calbi – mastering
Terry Casper – design
Peg Hambright – design, illustration
Johnny Sughrue – photography

Notes 

Judybats albums
1991 debut albums
Sire Records albums